The Toyota Fortuner, also known as the Toyota SW4, is a mid-size SUV manufactured by the Japanese automaker Toyota since 2004. Built on the Hilux pickup truck platform, it features two/three rows of seats and is available in either rear-wheel drive or four-wheel drive configuration. It is a part of Toyota's IMV project for emerging markets, which also includes the Hilux and the Innova.

The name Fortuner is derived from the English word fortune.

Production 
While the first-generation Fortuner was developed in Thailand by Thai and Japanese engineers, its facelifted version, as well as the Hilux and Innova, was designed in Australia by Toyota Australia, which is also responsible for developing the second-generation model.

For the medium body-on-frame SUV segment, Toyota offers the Hilux Surf/4Runner (Japan/North America) and the Land Cruiser Prado (Europe and Australasia). However, in some Central and South American countries and New Zealand, Toyota offers the Fortuner alongside the 4Runner and/or Prado, like in Peru, Panama, Ecuador, Colombia, and Guatemala.

Specialised variants with a naturally-aspirated 5L-E diesel engine is offered to governments, organisations and the UN alongside other utility vehicles such as the Prado, Hilux, HiAce, and the 70 and 200 series Land Cruisers.

First generation (AN50/AN60; 2004)

The first generation Fortuner was unveiled in December 2004 at the Thailand International Motor Expo and was available for sale in early 2005. It is positioned below the Land Cruiser and above the RAV4.

At first, the Fortuner was sold with 4 different types of 2 petrol engines and 2 diesel engines. All variants were offered in 4×2 (RWD) or 4×4 configuration, with 5-speed manual transmission and a 4 or 5-speed automatic transmission. In August 2012, the 2.5-litre common-rail turbodiesel 2KD-FTV engine was upgraded to a variable nozzle turbocharger (VNT) which was already equipped in the 3.0-litre common-rail turbo diesel 1KD-FTV since its introduction in 2005 to increase power and torque about 60%, also reducing fuel consumption up to 30%. With this VNT equipment, the Fortuner could now accelerate from 0–100 km/h (0–62 mph) in about 11 seconds (less than 10 seconds for 3.0-litre engine). It was launched to commemorate Pertamina's successful expedition from Jakarta, Indonesia to Rome, Italy (a distance of roughly 20,000 kilometres) using a group of Fortuners.

Variants 
A number of engine options are available depending on the country of sale, including a 2.7-litre 2TR-FE and 4.0-litre 1GR-FE V6 petrol with Variable Valve Timing and 2.5-litre 2KD-FTV and 3.0-litre 1KD-FTV common rail variable geometry turbocharger diesel models.

Grade levels are G and G Luxury for rear-wheel drive diesel and petrol, and V for 4×4 Diesel and petrol. The common rail turbo intercooled diesel has functional scoop on its hood.

In 2007, Toyota Thailand dropped the 4×4 petrol model and replaced it with a two-wheel drive petrol version.

Markets

Argentina 
In Argentina, it is assembled in Zárate and sold as the Toyota SW4 in petrol and diesel versions. It is the only D-segment SUV made in Argentina.

As of 2020, the Argentine version has over 40% locally and 60% regionally made parts.

Brazil 
Like in Argentina, it is known as the SW4 in Brazil and sold since 2006. In this market, there were 3 engine options offered: 3.0-litre 1KD-FTV diesel, 4.0-litre 1GR-FE V6 petrol and 2.7-litre 2TR-FE flex fuel (petrol and ethanol).

Brunei 
Launched in 2005, the Fortuner in Brunei is available in 2.5-litre manual G grade with and 3.0-litre automatic V grade. The 2.5 G was available in 4×2 while the 3.0 V had full-time 4×4.

Colombia 
The Fortuner was unveiled in Colombia in 2005 and launched in 2007 as a replacement for the locally assembled Prado that had been under production for 9 years without any changes. The Prado continued in production until 2009. A new grade was added in 2010, the Fortuner Urbana, with a petrol 2.7 L engine in 4×4 and 4×2 models.

The Fortuner is available in the following grade levels:
Fortuner Urbana 4×2, with a 2.7-litre engine.
Fortuner Urbana 4×4 with a 2.7-litre engine.
Fortuner Plus Diesel, with a 3.0-litre turbo engine.
All of them come standard with a 5-speed manual transmission or an optional 4-speed automatic transmission.

Ecuador 
The Fortuner was unveiled in South America – Ecuador in 2005 and launched in 2007. Versions of the Fortuner have come from Venezuela and Thailand. There are various grade levels available, originally only 4×4 and 4×2 options using a V6 4.0-litre petrol engine were sold. Since 2010, a 2.7-litre engine option was introduced. New facelift models were also introduced. All grades come standard with a 5-speed manual transmission or an optional 4-speed automatic transmission.

Egypt 
The Fortuner was unveiled in Egypt in 2010 and launched in 2011. It is available in two grades with two petrol engines: the 4-litre V6 1GR-FE, and the 2.7-litre inline-four 2TR-FE. All have automatic transmission and 4×4. Starting from April 2012, the car was assembled in Egypt at Arab American Vehicles.

India 
Toyota launched the Fortuner in India in 2009. It is assembled at the Bidadi, Karnataka plant of Toyota Kirloskar Motor from imported CKD kits. Fortuner production increased to more than 950 vehicles per month from the initial 500 units per month.

Originally there was only one grade model sold, which was the 3.0-litre 1KD-FTV engine 4×4 model, with leather upholstery, manual transmission and climatronic as standard. At the 2012 Indian Auto Expo, Toyota launched the 3.0-litre 4×2 option in both manual and automatic transmission. The top-of-the-range Fortuner 3.0 4×4 AT was introduced to the Indian market in January 2015 along with a 2.5-litre 2KD-FTV engine with 5-speed manual and 5-speed automatic transmission. This 2.5-litre variant was only available in 4×2 configuration.

Indonesia 
The Fortuner was introduced on 8 July 2005 at the 13th Gaikindo Auto Expo in Jakarta. Initially, the Fortuner was imported from Thailand and sold in 2.7 G (4×2) and 2.7 V (4WD) grade levels. The rear wheel drive 2.7 G was offered in the base grade with fabric interior and the Luxury with leather interior and premium sound system. The 3.0-litre diesel engine option is not sold in Indonesia, due to the heavier tax regulations imposed on vehicles with diesel engines larger than 2.5-litre.

It is mated to a 5-speed manual transmission. Since then, the Fortuner is assembled locally at the Karawang plant to fulfill the local market and exports to the Middle East (GCC) market.

In mid-2009, a newer variant was added to the lineup, which is the 2.5 G with a 4-speed automatic transmission. The 2.5 G grade can be ordered with "TRD Sportivo" body kits, which is also available as dealer installed options for other models. The 2.5 G 4×4 grade with automatic transmission was released in August 2014.

Kazakhstan 
In June 2014, Toyota announced that complete knock-down (CKD) production of the Fortuner at a production facility of Saryarka AvtoProm LLP (SAP). Plans call for a production of approximately 3,000 units annually and the hiring of an additional 100 employees in SAP.

Malaysia 
The Toyota Fortuner was launched in Malaysia in August 2005 with two grade models: the 2.5 G and the 2.7 V.

In August 2008, the first facelift for the Toyota Fortuner was made available in Malaysia with four grade models: 2.5 G, 2.5 G TRD Sportivo, 2.7 V and 2.7 V TRD Sportivo.

In October 2011, the second facelift for the Toyota Fortuner was made available in Malaysia again with four grade models: 2.5 G, 2.5 G TRD Sportivo, 2.7 V and 2.7 V TRD Sportivo.

In October 2013, the Fortuner underwent a minor update. Changes included different colour for the wheels and black upholstery. Grade levels remained the same as the previous model. ISOFIX became standard across the range.

In February 2015, another minor update occurred. Changes included smoked head and tail lamps, bumper-mounted LED DRLs, different TRD Sportivo decals.

The 2.7 V and 2.7 V TRD Sportivo carried a 2.7-litre petrol engine. It was available only in 4-speed automatic transmission with ECT. The 2.5 G and 2.5 G TRD Sportivo had a 2.5-litre diesel engine. At the outset, available with a 5-speed manual transmission only, but for the 2009 model year facelift it was replaced by a 4-speed automatic. In August 2012, together with the Hilux, the engine received a variable nozzle intercooled turbocharger.

Pakistan 
The Fortuner was launched in Pakistan in February 2013. Initially offered in two variants, Fortuner 2.7 VVT-i and TRD Sportivo, all with the 2.7-litre 2TR-FE engine.

Philippines 
The Fortuner was introduced in 2005. It fills in the gap between the smaller RAV4, and the more premium Land Cruiser Prado. It was sold in two grade levels: the entry-level G, and the top-spec V.

The G models had three drivetrain options available; the 2.7-litre 2TR-FE petrol engine with VVT-i, or the 2.5-litre 2KD-FTV engine with common rail diesel (D-4D) that either came with a 4-speed automatic transmission, or a 5-speed manual. As for the V models, engine options were limited to diesel engines with automatic transmissions only with a choice of the 2.5-litre 2KD-FTV or the 3.0-litre 1KD-FTV. The top-of-the-line 4x4 model was equipped with the 1KD-FTV engine with D-4D technology and came with a 4-speed automatic transmission and a low range transfer case. 

In October 2011, the Fortuner received a new front fascia, headlights and tail lights alongside the facelifted Innova and Hilux. The drivetrains remain the same.

In September 2012, the 2.5-litre 2KD-FTV diesel engine was upgraded with Variable Nozzle Turbocharger (VNT) with intercooler. According to Toyota Motor Philippines, the engine would have improved fuel efficiency and produce additional power by 40% and increase torque by 30%. A new feature for the Fortuner 4×4 V diesel and 4×2 G diesel automatic variants was an audio system with GPS.

GCC 

In Saudi Arabia and the UAE, the Fortuner was launched in 2005. There are two grades sold in Saudi Arabia, called the "GX" and the "VX" grades. The GX came with the 2.7-litre engine and 5-speed manual as standard (4-speed automatic is an option) and optional 4×4 whereas the VX came with the 4.0-litre V6 1GR-FE with standard 4×4 and all wheel drive with either a 5-speed automatic or 5-speed manual transmission. There is no diesel variant available. In the UAE, when the facelifted version was released the Fortuner was available in two variants, the 2.7-litre petrol engine and 4.0-litre petrol engine. In 2015 the Fortuner in the UAE came available with TRD body kits. As of 2015, the Fortuner is available in four variants: 2.7 EXR, 2.7 TRD Sportivo, 4.0 GXR, 4.0 VXR and 4.0 TRD Sportivo.

Singapore 
The Fortuner was introduced in 2005 in Singapore by Borneo Motors (Toyota's authorised dealer in Singapore), with the 2.7 V grade being the only available model. It received two facelifts, with changes to the headlight and tail light clusters in its first facelift in 2006, and new bumpers and grill design, new headlamp and clear tail lamp clusters, and blackwood grain trim in its interior for the second facelift in 2011. Later models included a touchscreen telematics navigation system. Due to the car's height (1.85 m), the car cannot clear the height limit in some Singaporean car parks.

South Africa 
The Fortuner was unveiled in South Africa in 2005 and launched in 2006 where it became the best-selling SUV since its launch. Toyota released an updated model in 2009. In 2011, the Fortuner benefited from another facelift, together with its sibling the Hilux. A 2.5-litre diesel engine was added to the newly facelifted range. Again in 2013, the Fortuner received some minor interior upgrades notably for the first time; the introduction of a black leather interior. The sound system was also upgraded together with the navigation system.

Venezuela 
Two grades are available for 2011 – 4×4 and 4×2 – both with the 4.0-litre V6 engine. The assembly plant is located in Cumaná.

Vietnam 
In February 2009, Toyota Motor Vietnam (TMV) started to produce Fortuner – SUV of IMV series. And the Fortuner has soon occupied the first position in medium high SUV segment in Vietnam with the accumulated sales of nearly 25,000 units with a steady SUV market share at 64% with 6,129 units sold in 2012.

Facelifts

2008 
A minor redesign of the Fortuner was launched in July 2008. It was first unveiled in Thailand, and then at the 16th Indonesia International Motor Show. It features new projector headlamps and grille, new rear lights, Bluetooth connectivity, new light sand interior, electronic adjustable driver's seat in 4×4 V model, rear air conditioning from ceiling for second, and third row which was originally located on the sides. Electronic Brake Force Distribution, with Brake Assist replacing LSPV in some models only. Its newly redesigned front grille and front lamps are in the style of the Land Cruiser 200 Series.

2011 
The second facelift Fortuner was introduced in July 2011. It was first unveiled in Bangkok, Thailand. The front fascia was completely revised with a new fender, hood, grille, headlamps, tail lamps, bumper and fog light housing, similar to the J200 Land Cruiser. The tail lamps were redesigned with clear housing similar to the first generation Lexus RX. The rear bumper, rear garnish plate were also revised. Changes in the sides includes a new sharper fender flares, LED integrated side view mirrors and the wheels was also redesigned similar to the 2012 Hilux. Minor changes were also made to the interior including the centre console, steering wheel and audio/video system were also upgraded. The Fortuner later also received a new VNT (Variable Nozzle Turbo) intercooled turbo engine.

Second generation (AN150/AN160; 2015) 

The second generation Fortuner was unveiled simultaneously on 16 July 2015 in Australia and Thailand. Along with the Hilux, the Fortuner features the "Keen Look" design language. Both the Hilux and Fortuner share the chassis, transmission and engine lineup, with two new diesel engines from the GD series. The 2.7-litre and 4.0-litre petrol engines were updated with Dual VVT-i. The second-generation Fortuner features a part-time 4×4 system instead of the full-time 4×4 system used in the previous generation.

Development was led by executive chief engineer Hiroki Nakajima. Despite sharing the hood panels, front pillar area, windscreen glass and front doors as the Hilux, the exterior of the Fortuner has been described as more slim-looking, featuring slim headlights with bi-beam LED projector as an option and blacked-out D-pillars for a "floating roof" look. Toyota designers drew inspiration from their own Land Cruiser and Land Cruiser Prado heritage, as a means of differentiating the Fortuner from competing body-on-frame SUV rivals.

Since this generation, the Fortuner no longer shares the interior design with the Hilux to give a distinct character between the two. As the result, the interior took an upwards step in perceived quality with an upright dashboard design with synthetic leather trims with stitching, a three-spoke steering wheel shared with the Hilux and a modern instrument cluster with a large colour TFT LCD multi-info display.

The Fortuner also features larger cross sections for its ladder frame, and sits on double wishbone front suspension and five-link rear suspension with coil springs. The rear differential lock also has its componentry placed within the differential housing for improved off-road protection.

All variants are equipped with ABS, EBD, dual airbags plus knee airbag, "follow me home" light function, all around sensor, glove box with chiller function, digital automatic climate control, all auto power windows along with tilt and telescopic steering wheel as standard. All variants have Eco Mode and Power Mode features to adjust throttle responses. The front braking system consists of 17" disc brakes, whilst the rear braking system uses drum brakes, except in Australia and India where disc brakes are used all around. In 2017, the Fortuner was upgraded to disc brakes all around in all markets. In the third row, the 50:50 split seats continue to flips up onto the body side while being folded instead of folding flat into the floor like on most of its competitors.

Powertrain 
The Fortuner is powered by a range of petrol and diesel engines. The two GD series engines are newly developed for this generation, which feature common-rail direct-injection and variable nozzle turbocharging; the 2.8-litre also gets auto start-stop in some markets. The 2.7-litre petrol engine is lighter and equipped with Dual VVT-i, improved combustion and less friction.

Markets

Australia 
The Fortuner was unveiled in Australia in July 2015 and went on sale in October 2015. It is sold only with 4×4, 2.8-litre turbo-diesel with only a six-speed automatic transmission. Three model grades are available: GX, GXL and Crusade.

In 2022, the Australian market Fortuner was no longer sourced from Thailand, instead it is imported from Indonesia.

India 
The second generation Fortuner was launched in November 2016 with two engine options, 2.8-litre diesel and 2.7-litre petrol with either manual or automatic transmission, 4×2 or 4×4.

In early 2020, the Indian market Fortuner was upgraded to meet the Bharat Stage 6 emissions standards, which necessitate the addition of diesel particulate filter (DPF).

The facelifted Fortuner was launched in India in January 2021, which is offered in both standard and Legender grades. In May 2022, the GR Sport variant was released as the highest grade.

Indonesia 
The second generation Fortuner was launched in January 2016. Initial grade models were G (diesel, available in 4×2 with manual and automatic transmission, and 4×4 with automatic unit), VRZ (diesel, available in either 4×2 or 4×4, only with automatic transmission), and SRZ (petrol 4×2 automatic). Initial engine options were the 2.7-litre petrol engine or the 2.4-litre diesel engine.

The TRD Sportivo body kits were also available for the SRZ and VRZ variants (4×2 only) from August 2017 up to August 2021. In August 2018, the Fortuner was updated to comply with the Euro 4 emission standards. The TRD Sportivo model received a minor update in July 2019.

The facelifted Fortuner was launched in Indonesia in October 2020. In August 2021, the TRD Sportivo variant was renamed to GR Sport while the standard SRZ grade was removed from the lineup, leaving only its GR Sport variant.

In January 2022, the 2.4-litre diesel engine option for VRZ grade and its GR Sport variant was replaced with the 2.8-litre diesel engine. The standard 4×4 VRZ grade was also replaced by its GR Sport variant with the 2.8-litre diesel engine, alongside the discontinuation of 4×4 G grade.

Laos 
The second generation Fortuner was launched in March 2016 with one model grade, V 4×4 with 3.0-litre diesel engine and 5-speed automatic transmission. In August 2017, the Fortuner was updated with an introduction of the new 2.8-litre diesel engine that replaced the old 3.0-litre diesel engine used in the outgoing model along with other upgrades.

Malaysia 
The second generation Fortuner was launched in May 2016 and was offered in 2.4 VRZ 4×4 turbodiesel and 2.7 SRZ 4×4 petrol variants with automatic transmissions. In January 2017, both variants obtained "Energy Efficient Vehicle" (EEV) status from the government, which reduced its price. In September 2017, the 2.4 VRZ was renamed as the 2.4 4×4 and two additional grade models were introduced: 2.4 VRZ 4×2 and 2.4 VRZ 4×4.

The facelifted Fortuner was launched in Malaysia in February 2021 alongside the facelifted Innova. It is offered in three variants: 2.4 4×4, 2.7 SRZ 4×4 and 2.8 VRZ 4×4. In November 2021, the Fortuner SRZ and VRZ models was updated with dual-zone automatic climate control as standard along with other upgrades.

Pakistan 
The second-generation Fortuner was launched on 27 September 2016 with a petrol variant. 

In late 2017, Toyota Indus introduced the Sigma 4 variant of the Fortuner, powered by the 2.8 litre diesel engine. 

In January 2020, Toyota Indus introduced the G grade as the base petrol model of the Fortuner.

In early 2022, the Legender variant was added to the lineup.

Philippines 
The second generation Fortuner was launched in the Philippines on 14 January 2016 with two new diesel engines (2.8-litre and 2.4-litre), and an updated 2.7-litre petrol engine. Initial grade levels were the entry-level G and top-spec V.

In August 2017, the Fortuner was refreshed for the 2018 model year. Rear disc brakes became standard on all grades along with other upgrades. The Fortuner became the best-selling car in the Philippines in 2017.

The facelifted Fortuner was launched in the Philippines on 17 October 2020. It is offered in 2.4 G, 2.4 V, 2.8 Q and 2.8 LTD grade levels with the 2.7 G petrol variant being discontinued. In September 2021, the Fortuner received another feature list upgrade.

Russia 
The Fortuner went on sale in Russia in October 2017. The Fortuner sold in Russia is only available in 4×4 with 2.8-litre turbo-diesel and 2.7-litre petrol engines, with either five-speed manual or six-speed automatic gearbox. Four grade choices are offered: Standard, Comfort, Elegance and Prestige. Fortuners sold in the Russian market are imported from Thailand.

Thailand 
In Thailand, initial grade levels were the G and V. In March 2016, the TRD Sportivo variant was added to the lineup.

In 2021, the Fortuner gained a new body kit by Modellista. The GR Sport variant also became available. 

In February 2022, a special variant called the Commander was released. Only 1,000 units were produced.

In August 2022, the regular Fortuner was replaced with Leader G and Leader V grade levels, which share the styling with the upmarket Legender model.

Facelift 
The facelifted Fortuner debuted on 4 June 2020 for the Thai market alongside the facelifted Hilux. The Legender flagship sub-model (known as VRZ in Malaysia, LTD in the Philippines, Diamond in South America, and Black Onyx in Russia) was introduced to replace the Thai market TRD Sportivo model. The Legender grade is equipped with a different headlight units from the standard grades and different front and rear bumper designs which designed to be in-line with Toyota crossover SUVs. It is also equipped with 20-inch wheels, interior ambient lighting, two-tone leather seats, JBL sound system, and a set of Toyota Safety Sense active safety systems.

The Legender-based GR Sport variant with different styling from the Indonesian market Fortuner GR Sport was launched in Thailand on 26 August 2021, in the Philippines on 23 October 2021, in Brazil on 8 December 2021 and in India on 12 May 2022. It is only available in 2.8-litre diesel engine option with 4×4.

Sales

References

External links 

  (Philippines)

Fortuner
Cars introduced in 2005
2010s cars
2020s cars
Mid-size sport utility vehicles
Rear-wheel-drive vehicles
All-wheel-drive vehicles
Cars powered by longitudinal 4-cylinder engines